Besu may refer to:

People
 Besu Sado (born 1996), Ethiopian athlete

Places
 Besu River, India

Other
 Bengal Engineering and Science University